Christiane Éluère (born 1946, known in English as Christiane Eluère) is a French curator of heritage, archaeologist and historian specialised in the history of the Celts.

Career 
Christiane Éluère is chief curator of the Center for Research and Restoration of Museums of France. At the National Archaeological Museum in Saint-Germain-en-Laye, she shares responsibility for the protohistoric collections. In 1987, she helped to organise the exhibition  ('Treasures of the Celtic Princes').

She is the author of several books on European protohistory and the Celts.

Selected publications 
 L'Or des Celtes, Office du livre, 1987
 Les secrets de l'or antique, La Bibliothèque des Arts, 1989
 Secrets of Ancient Gold, Düdingen: Trio, 1990
 L'Europe des Celtes, collection « Découvertes Gallimard » (nº 158), série Histoire. Éditions Gallimard, 1992
 UK edition – The Celts: First Masters of Europe, 'New Horizons' series, Thames & Hudson, 1993, reprinted 1995, 1997, 2000, 2004, 2010
 US edition – The Celts: Conquerors of Ancient Europe, "Abrams Discoveries" series. Harry N. Abrams, 1993
 L'art des Celtes, Citadelles et Mazenod, 2004

In collaboration
 With Jean-Pierre Mohen, L'Europe à l'âge du bronze : Le temps des héros, collection « Découvertes Gallimard » (nº 378), série Histoire. Éditions Gallimard, 1999
 US edition – The Bronze Age in Europe, "Abrams Discoveries" series. Harry N. Abrams, 2000
 UK edition – The Bronze Age in Europe: Gods, Heros and Treasures, 'New Horizons' series, Thames & Hudson, 2000
 AA.VV., Gods and Heroes of the European Bronze Age, Thames & Hudson, 1999

References 

1946 births
Celtic studies scholars
20th-century French archaeologists
French women archaeologists
20th-century French historians
French women historians
20th-century French non-fiction writers
Living people
20th-century French women writers
French women curators